Match for Michaela was a Gaelic football match played under floodlights at Casement Park in Belfast on Saturday 3 November 2012. The match was held in memory of Michaela McAreavey.

Background
All-Ireland Senior Champions Donegal played a team comprising players from the rest of Ulster in an event intended to raise funds for The Michaela Foundation. Match for Michaela was launched on 25 October 2012.

Match for Michaela marked the first occasion that the Donegal senior football team played since winning the 2012 All-Ireland Senior Football Championship Final on 23 September. The game took place ahead of a planned redevelopment of Casement Park.

Team selection

Donegal
Donegal manager Jim McGuinness named a squad featuring six All Stars—Paul Durcan, Frank McGlynn, Karl Lacey, Neil Gallagher, Mark McHugh and Michael Murphy. The position of Lacey, the 2012 All Stars Footballer of the Year, was in some doubt ahead of the game after he picked up a hamstring injury playing for his club Four Masters. As the final of the 2012 Donegal Senior Football Championship was the following day, players from the St Eunan's and Naomh Conaill clubs were excused. Among these were Rory Kavanagh, Leo McLoone and Anthony Thompson.

 Manager: Jim McGuinness
 Selectors: Rory Gallagher, Maxi Curran, Pat Shovelin
 Surgical consultant: Kevin Moran
 Team doctor: Charlie McManus
 Team physio: Dermot Simpson 
 Backroom team: Physical Therapists: Charlie Molloy, Paul Coyle, Donal Reid, JD.

Ulster
Ulster manager Joe Kernan named a squad containing at least one player from every county in Ulster, apart from their opponents Donegal. Four players from Tyrone were named in the squad.

 Manager: Joe Kernan

Match details

References

External links
 The Michaela Foundation
 In pictures: GAA stars turn out to remember Michaela McAreavey
 Match Video

2012 in Gaelic football
2012 in Northern Ireland sport
Donegal county football team matches
Gaelic football matches
Ulster GAA
November 2012 sports events in Europe